Hapoel Afula may refer to:
Hapoel Afula F.C. - football club
Hapoel Afula B.C. - basketball club

Hapoel